Ipaglaban Mo!, also known as Kapag Nasa Katwiran, Ipaglaban Mo! or Kapag May Katwiran... Ipaglaban Mo! was a Philippine television public service and advocacy-driven legal drama anthology show broadcast by Kapamilya Channel under ABS-CBN Entertainment and ABS-CBN News and Current Affairs, featuring dramatizations of actual cases brought and settled in the Supreme Court and Court of Appeals of the Philippines.

Final Hosts
 Atty. Jose C. Sison 
 Joseph Peter "Jopet" S. Sison

History

1988–1999: Original run
Kapag May Katwiran, Ipaglaban Mo! was originally aired over IBC on June 13, 1988, and last aired on August 14, 1992. The program transferred to ABS-CBN on August 16, 1992, under Milliard Productions as a blocktime program. After 52 episodes, the show "premiered" in September 1993 as a station produced program and ended on March 7, 1999, being replaced by Tabing Ilog on its Sunday timeslot.

This past episodes (1992-1999) is currently streaming on Jeepney TV YouTube Channel every 1st quarter of the month, together with Calvento Files & Star Drama Theater every 5:00 pm.

This series is currently airing (1992-1999 era) on Kapamilya Online Live Global every Sunday and Monday, 5:00 am.

Also past episodes (1988-1992 and 1999-2000) will be uploaded on Ipaglaban Mo Foundation YouTube Channel.

2012–2014: GMA News TV

A new series of Kapag nasa Katwiran, Ipaglaban Mo! was broadcast by GMA News TV (now GTV), premiering on November 10, 2012. It was hosted by Jose C. Sison and Jopet Sison. On June 16, 2013, the show returned for a 3rd season.

2014–2020: ABS-CBN/2020–present: Kapamilya Channel/A2Z
Fifteen years after the show ended on ABS-CBN, the legal drama returned on June 7, 2014, as part of the Yes Weekend! block, airing every Saturday at 3:30 pm, after It's Showtime and before S.O.C.O. while the replay is every Wednesday at 2:00 pm, and every Thursday at 1:00 am, on DZMM TeleRadyo and every Sunday at 3:00 pm, on Jeepney TV. The show is still hosted by Atty. Jose Sison together with his son Jopet Sison. It is simply called Ipaglaban Mo!.

On March 21, 2020, the show temporarily ceased production of the new episodes due to the 2020 Luzon enhanced community quarantine, hence halting the schedule of airing the new episodes. Re-runs of previous episodes were re-aired for the time being.

Following the temporary closure of ABS-CBN due to the cease and desist order of the National Telecommunications Commission (NTC) on account of its franchise expiration, on June 14, 2020, the show returned on the newly established Kapamilya Channel with new episodes but later on, it reverted to past episodes due to the ongoing COVID-19 pandemic in the Philippines. It aired its last episode on July 5, 2020, and has since aired random past episodes every Sunday at 4:00 pm and simulcasts with A2Z and on July 4, 2021, on free TV.

Episodes

See also
 List of programs broadcast by ABS-CBN
 List of programs broadcast by Kapamilya Channel
 List of programs previously broadcast by Intercontinental Broadcasting Corporation
 List of programs previously broadcast by QTV, Q, GMA News TV and GTV

References

External links
 
 

ABS-CBN drama series
ABS-CBN original programming
Intercontinental Broadcasting Corporation original programming
GMA News TV original programming
Philippine anthology television series
Star Cinema films
1980s Philippine television series
1990s Philippine television series
2020s Philippine television series
1989 Philippine television series debuts
1999 Philippine television series endings
2012 Philippine television series debuts
2013 Philippine television series endings
2014 Philippine television series debuts
2020 Philippine television series endings
English-language television shows
Filipino-language television shows
Films set in the Philippines
Philippine crime television series
Courtroom drama television series
Philippine legal television series
Domestic violence in television
ABS-CBN News and Current Affairs shows
Philippine television news shows